Rock N'Roll Love Letter is an album by the Bay City Rollers.  It was a North America-only release, issued in early 1976 by Arista Records, catalogue #4071.

Of the record's 11 tracks, two were lifted from the Rollers' 1975's UK release Once Upon a Star; seven came from Wouldn't You Like It?; and two were newly recorded singles.  The cover art features the same photo as Wouldn't You Like It?.

The album reached No. 1 in Canada on 27 March 1976, jumping from No. 25 to the top position in a single week to depose their previous album Bay City Rollers from the top slot. In the US, it went as high as No. 31 on Billboard's Pop Albums chart.  Two singles from the disc made Billboard's Top 40:  "Money Honey", which reached No. 1 in Canada and peaked at No. 9 in the US; and "Rock and Roll Love Letter", peaking at No. 6 in Canada (12 June 1976) and No. 28 in the US.

This album was finally released on CD (along with "Bay City Rollers") as a 2 LP On 1-CD set in 2011, by Wounded Bird Records.

Track listing
"Money Honey" (Eric Faulkner, Stuart Wood)
"La Belle Jeane" (Faulkner, Wood)
"Rock and Roll Love Letter" (Tim Moore)
"Maybe I'm a Fool to Love You" (Faulkner, Wood)
"Wouldn't You Like It" (Faulkner, Wood)
"I Only Wanna Dance With You" (Faulkner, Wood)
"Shanghai'd in Love" (Faulkner, Wood)
"Don't Stop the Music" (Faulkner, Wood)
"The Disco Kid" (Faulkner, Wood)
"Eagles Fly" (Faulkner, Wood)
"Too Young to Rock & Roll" (Faulkner, Wood)

Chart performance

Weekly charts

Year-end charts

Personnel
Eric Faulkner – Guitar
Alan Longmuir – Bass Guitar
Derek Longmuir – Drums
Les McKeown – Lead Vocals
Stuart "Woody" Wood – Guitar

References

1976 albums
Bay City Rollers albums
Albums produced by Phil Wainman
Arista Records albums